Miaenia gilmouri is a species of beetle in the family Cerambycidae. It was described by Breuning in 1962.

References

Miaenia
Beetles described in 1962